Pervomayskiy is a settlement in the city of Almaty (previously in Almaty Region), in south-eastern Kazakhstan.

References

Almaty